The French Rugby League Cup, also called Lord Derby Cup after its championship trophy, is the premier knockout competition for the sport of rugby league football in France. The French Cup was first contested in 1934–35, which also marked the first season of the French Rugby League Championship.

As of its last regularly-scheduled edition prior to the COVID-19 crisis, the Lord Derby Cup was open to all professional and amateur clubs. Each round is played in single-elimination mode.

History

Trophy 
Following in the footsteps of his father Frederick, patron of ice hockey's Stanley Cup, Edward Stanley, 17th Earl of Derby, donated the silver trophy that bears his name to inaugural French Cup champions US Lyon-Villeurbanne in 1935. Stanley was honorary president of the Rugby Football League, a former minister and former British ambassador in Paris. The actual name of the trophy, as engraved on the bowl, is Coupe de Lord Derby, although the more natural-sounding "Coupe Lord Derby" is almost always preferred. Among the rugby league crowd, the cup is affectionately known as The Old Lady.
Since 2017, each player from the winning team has received a replica of the cup for him to keep.

Evolution
For much of the tournament's history, games played at predetermined or mutually agreed upon neutral sites were the norm. While Toulouse struggled to field a stable team in the new code until 1937, it was still the go-to host city for many games during the tournament's formative years, both because it was viewed as a key market and because the relationship with rugby union authorities was much less contentious there than elsewhere in the country. In fact, Stade Toulousain considered renting its Stade Ernest-Wallon to the French Rugby League for the 1939 Lord Derby Cup final, before organizers settled on Stade du TOEC.
In the modern era, games at predetermined sites were gradually reduced to encourage fan attendance, and are typically only used in the last two rounds.

While all divisions have been actively encouraged to send teams in recent times, the level of amateur participation has varied over the years.

Toulouse curse 
Toulouse Olympique has endured many heartbreaks in the Lord Derby Cup, losing all of its first six finals, including three straight between 1962 and 1964. One of star player Georges Ailleres' career regrets was never hoisting the Lord Derby Cup while playing for his longtime club, despite making it to four finals with them. Ironically, he won the trophy in his only season played away from Toulouse, in 1965 with Lézignan. Toulouse would eventually break the curse in 2014, in their seventh final appearance.

Cinderella runs 
The Lord Derby Cup has historically been dominated by first division teams. Nonetheless, one-off wins by lower division clubs are not unheard of, and a handful of underdogs have produced cinderella runs over the years. In 1983, fourth-level side Le Soler advanced to the semifinals, beating top-flight club Pia in the process, before losing to powerhouse XIII Catalan. In 2005, third-level team Salses beat two Elite 1 teams (Lyon-Villeurbanne and Villeneuve-sur-Lot) before bowing out in the semifinals as well, this time to Limoux.

Guest team 
In 2016, Saluzzo Rugby, an Italian rugby union team from Piedmont (a province with close historical ties to francophone culture), switched codes and joined the fourth level of French rugby league. Thanks to the readmission of lower-tier teams into the Lord Derby Cup in 2017–18, they also became eligible for the tournament. However, with limited success on the field and mounting financial costs, the club withdrew from French rugby league altogether in 2019.

Satellite tournaments

Junior French Cup 
The equivalent of the Lord Derby Cup for Under-19 players is the Luc Nitard Cup, whose final is played as a curtain-raiser to the Lord Derby Cup final.

Other cup competitions 
To provide minor league clubs with a more accessible level of competition, the French federation has maintained a trio of secondary cup tournaments which are reserved for them. Each of these tournaments is marketed as a "Coupe de France" in its own right, although in practice they more closely fit the definition of a league cup. They are:
 The Georges Aillères Cup, for clubs at the Elite 2 level
 The Paul Dejean Cup, for clubs at the National Division level
 The Albert Falcou Cup, for clubs at the Federal Division level.

List of Finals

Results

Footnotes 
 Both semifinals were scheduled for 5 May 1940. Côte Basque beat XIII Catalan 14–5 in Bordeaux for the first final spot, but prior commitments at Toulouse's Stade des Minimes forced the postponement of the second semifinal between Pau and Carcassonne to 12 May. On 10 May, German troops invaded Belgium, the Netherlands and Luxembourg, forcing the cancellation of the remainder of the competition, whose final was scheduled for 19 May 1940 in Bordeaux.
 The final between AS Carcassonne and XIII Catalan was cancelled as a result of a game-ending brawl involving XIII Catalan at the championship final the previous week.

See also

Rugby league in France
French rugby league system
Challenge Cup

References

Bibliography

External links
Official website of the French Rugby League Federation

Rugby league competitions in France
European rugby league competitions
National cup competitions
French sports trophies and awards
Awards established in 1935
1934 establishments in France